The 2015 Vuelta a Murcia was the 31st professional edition of the Vuelta a Murcia cycle race and was held on 14 February 2015. The race started in Mazarrón and finished at the Castle of Lorca. The race was won by Rein Taaramäe.

Teams
Twenty-one teams competed in the 2015 Vuelta a Murcia. These included seven UCI WorldTeams, nine UCI Professional Continental, four UCI Continental teams and a Spanish national team.

The teams that participated in the race were:

Team Frøy–Bianchi

Spain

Result

References

External links

2015
2015 in road cycling
2015 in Spanish sport